Jafarabad (also Romanized as Ja‘farābād; also known as Ja‘farābād-e Malek) is a village in Qoroq Rural District, Baharan District, Gorgan County, Golestan Province, Iran. At the 2006 census, its population was 686, in 179 families.

References 

Populated places in Gorgan County